The 2024 United States Senate election in Tennessee will be held on November 5, 2024, to elect a member of the United States Senate to represent the state of Tennessee. Incumbent one-term Republican Senator Marsha Blackburn has not yet stated whether or not she is running for a second term. There has also been speculation that she could be a VP pick for Donald Trump's 2024 Presidential Campaign.

Republican primary

Candidates

Filed paperwork
Marsha Blackburn, incumbent U.S. Senator (2019–present)

Democratic primary

Candidates

Filed paperwork
Dylan Fain

General election

Candidates

Filed paperwork
Dr. Wisdom Zerit Telkay (Wisdom People Party)

Predictions

References

United States Senate elections in Tennessee
Tennessee